The Press–Schechter formalism is a mathematical model for predicting the number of objects (such as galaxies, galaxy clusters or dark matter halos) of a certain mass within a given volume of the Universe. It was described in an academic paper by William H. Press and Paul Schechter in 1974.

Background
In the context of cold dark matter cosmological models,
perturbations on all scales are imprinted on the universe at very early times,
for example by quantum fluctuations during an inflationary era.
Later, as radiation redshifts away, these become mass perturbations, and they
start to grow linearly.  Only long after that, starting with small mass scales
and advancing over time to larger mass scales, do the perturbations actually
collapse to form (for example) galaxies or clusters of galaxies, in so-called
hierarchical structure formation (see Physical cosmology).

Press and Schechter observed that the fraction of mass in collapsed objects
more massive than some mass M is related to the fraction of volume samples
in which the smoothed initial density fluctuations are above some
density threshold.  This yields a formula for the mass function (distribution
of masses) of objects at any given time.

Result

Its value is:

 is the standard deviation per unit volume of the fluctuation from which the object was formed had gravitationally collapsed, at the time of the gravitational collapse, and R is the scale of the universe at that time. Parameters with subscript 0 are at the time of the initial creation of the fluctuations (or any later time before the gravitational collapse).

Qualitatively, the prediction is that the mass distribution is a power law for
small masses, with an exponential cutoff above some characteristic mass that
increases with time.  Such functions had previously been noted by Schechter
as observed luminosity functions,
and are now known as Schechter luminosity functions.  The Press-Schechter
formalism provided the first quantitative model for how such functions might
arise.

The case of a scale-free power spectrum, n=0 (or, equivalently, a scalar spectral index of 1), is very close to the spectrum of the current standard cosmological model. In this case,  has a simpler form. Written in mass-free units:

Assumptions and derivation sketch
The Press–Schechter formalism is derived by assuming that each object is formed by gravitational collapse of a density fluctuation. Furthermore, the fluctuations are assumed to be small at some early cosmological time, and are treated with a linear approximation, even though the eventual collapse is itself a non-linear process.

The density fluctuations are normally distributed, and their variance is:

A fractional fluctuation ; at some cosmological time reaches gravitational collapse after the universe has expanded by a factor of 1/δ since that time.

Generalizations
A number of generalizations of the Press–Schechter formula exist, such as the Sheth–Tormen approximation.

References

Astrophysics
Equations of astronomy
Mathematical modeling